Siponiai is a village in Kėdainiai district municipality, in Kaunas County, in central Lithuania. It is located by the Dotnuvėlė and Kačupys rivers. According to the 2011 census, the village has a population of 96 people. There is mythological stone "Ožakmenis" ("The Goat Stone") in the Siponiai village.

Demography

References

Villages in Kaunas County
Kėdainiai District Municipality